3. Liga is the third tier of the German football league system.

3. Liga, 3. liga or 3 liga may also refer to:
 3. Liga (Slovakia), third-highest football league in Slovakia
 3. Liga (Switzerland), football league in Switzerland
 3. Liga Süd-West, third-highest level of Rugby union league system in Germany
 III liga, fourth-highest football league in Poland

See also
 III Lyga, football league in Lithuania
 III liiga, football league in Estonia
 Liga (disambiguation)
 1. Liga (disambiguation)
 2. Liga (disambiguation)
 4. Liga (disambiguation)
 Liga 3 (disambiguation)
 Liga III, the third level of the Romanian football league system